Himmelstalundshallen is an indoor arena in Norrköping, Sweden. It is home arena for the ice hockey team HC Vita Hästen and holds 4,280 people. Construction was completed on 4 October 1977 and the arenas was inaugurated with a ceremony lasting for three days between 7–9 October the same year. On 29 November that year, an indoor soccer competition was played in Himmelstalundshallen, won by Hammarby IF.

The arena hosted the preliminary games of group B at the men's FIBA European Basketball Championship in September 2003.

See also
List of indoor arenas in Sweden
List of indoor arenas in Nordic countries

References

External links

Indoor arenas in Sweden
Indoor ice hockey venues in Sweden
Ice hockey venues in Sweden
Buildings and structures in Norrköping
Sport in Norrköping
Sports venues completed in 1977
1977 establishments in Sweden